Watashi no Aozora (私の青空) is a Japanese television drama series and the 62nd Asadora series, following Asuka. It premiered on April 3, 2000 and concluded on September 30, 2000.

Plot

Cast

Kitayama family 

 Tomoko Tabata as Nazuna Kitayama
 Takuma Shinoda as Taiyō Kitayama, Nazuna's son
 Shiro Ito as Tatsuo Kitayama, Nazuna and Gen's father
 Mariko Kaga as Tamae Kitayama, Nazuna and Gen's mother
 Yūta Kawasaki as Gen Kitayama, Nazuna's brother
 Akira Takarada as Jōji Murai, Kento's father

Tonegawa boxing gym 

 Michitaka Tsutsui as Kento Murai
 Tetsu Watanabe as Bazooka Tonegawa, a former champion and president of boxing gym
 Kanako Fukaura as Chiyoko Tonegawa
 Akira Akasaka as Prince Kondo

Musashi Ice Industry 

 Shinya Yamamoto as Musashi Miyagawa, the owner and president of Musashi Ice Industry
 Kazue Tsunogae as Kyōko Miyagawa, Musashi's wife
 Reiko Matsuo as Noriko Miyagawa, Musashi and Kyōko's daughter
 Atsushi Onita as Muhomatsu, an employee of Musashi Ice Industry
 Kinba Sanyutei as Karuo Harukaze, an employee of Musashi Ice Industry
 Kin Sugai as Tome Hida, a Hirwayuken coffee shop mama

Kachidoki Elementary School 

 Aki Takejo as Sayuri Takashima, a nutritionist at the school lunch kitchen
 Takaaki Itō as Gorō Hinata, a teacher

Others 

 Kai Atō as Shōta Takashima, a truck driver
 Masao Kusakari as Jirō Amamiya, a famous cosmetics employee
 Nobuo Yana as Denkichi Tanaka, a tuna fisherman
 Kiyoshi Nakajō as Fumihiko Madenokōji, Muhomatsu's brother
 Kinō Sanyutei as Junnosuke Yoshimoto, an apartment landlord

External links 

 

2000 Japanese television series debuts
2000 Japanese television series endings
Asadora
Television shows set in Aomori Prefecture
Television shows set in Tokyo